Super Hits is a 1999 compilation album by Brooks & Dunn. It is part of a series of similar Super Hits albums issued by Sony BMG, the parent company of Brooks & Dunn's label, Arista Nashville.

It is also one of two albums not to feature the duo’s signature longhorn skull emblem on the cover.

Track listing

Critical reception

Super Hits received three out of five stars from Stephen Thomas Erlewine of Allmusic. Erlewine concludes that the album is "entertaining," although most fans would be "better-served by the definitive Greatest Hits."

Chart performance
Super Hits peaked at #43 on the U.S. Billboard Top Country Albums chart.

References

1999 greatest hits albums
Brooks & Dunn albums
Arista Records compilation albums